Holger Lissner (born 15 July 1938 in Rynkeby), is a Danish priest and hymn writer.

Biography 
Lissner was a teacher at Løgumkloster Højskole from 1971-1979 and a priest in Sønder Bjert from 1980–2003, before retiring in 2003.

He worked a lot with hymns, both as a hymn writer, and as editor of collections of new hymns and choral works. He also wrote the liturgies for church services, including "Spillemandsmessen", a service with music for Danish folk musicians.

In Denmark, Lissner is known for writing a Christian version of the Lucia song in 1982.

In Norway, he is known for the advent hymn "Nå tenner vi vår adventskrans", which is in the 1985 edition of The Norsk Salmebok.

Works 
Holger Lisner has published:
 Løgumklostesangbogen (Salmer og sange til vor tid), 1974 (editor)
 Det levende vand (choral work), 1990
 Gudstjeneste for alle sanser, 1995
 Du fylder mig med glæde (hymns) 1998
 Jonas (musical) 1996
 Livets træ, 1998

Hymns 
Holger Lisner is represented by the following original hymns in the 2003 edition of Den Danske Salmebog:
 371: Du fylder mig med glæde
 414: Den mægtige finder vi ikke
 660: Kom, hjælp mig, Herre Jesus
 678: Guds fred er glæden i dit sind
 698: Kain, hvor er din bror?
 786: Nu går solen sin vej

References 

Danish Lutheran hymnwriters
1938 births
Danish Lutheran clergy
Living people